The 1965 National Semi-Professional Football League was the second season of the Korea Semi-Professional Football League. The 1965 season was divided into spring league and autumn league. Spring league was held from 4 April to 23 May 1965.

Spring

Champions

Autumn

Champions

References

Korean National Semi-Professional Football League